USS Bogue (AVG/ACV/CVE/CVHE-9) was the lead ship in the  of escort carriers in the United States Navy during World War II. The ship was named for Bogue Sound in North Carolina.

Originally classified AVG-9, this was changed to ACV-9 on 20 August 1942; CVE-9 on 15 July 1943 and CVHE-9, on 12 June 1955. She was part of an effective force, where aircraft operating from Bogue or ships escorting the carrier claimed ten German and two Japanese submarines between May 1943 and July 1945.

Construction
Bogue was laid down on 1 October 1941, as Steel Advocate under Maritime Commission contract, MC hull #170, by Seattle-Tacoma Shipbuilding, in Tacoma, Washington.  She was launched on 15 January 1942 sponsored by Mrs W. Miller, the wife of Lieutenant Commander Miller, transferred to the United States Navy on the 1 May 1942 and commissioned on the 26 September 1942.

Aircraft carried
Bogue had capacity for up to 24 fighter and anti-submarine aircraft normally a mixture of Grumman; Wildcat and Avengers with composition dependent upon mission. The squadron had the callsign VC-9 (Composite Squadron Nine).  When she was utilised in a ferry role, she could carry up to 90 aircraft depending on aircraft type.

Service history
After a shakedown cruise and repair period, Bogue joined the Atlantic Fleet in February 1943. Although she escorted convoys early in her career, she served principally as the nucleus of independent, highly successful anti-submarine hunter-killer groups for Atlantic theater carrier operations.

1943
During March and April, she made three North Atlantic crossings, departing on her fourth crossing on 22 April. On 21 May, her Avengers damaged  and the resulting chlorine gas leak knocked out both of the boats radio transmitters forcing the boat to return to  La Pallice in occupied France.

The Captain ordered his crew to scuttle the boat and 24 of the crew were later captured by the Canadian destroyer .

On 12 June, the already damaged  was sunk by aircraft from Bogue with bombs and gunfire, at  16 of the boat's crew were picked up by the escort vessel .

Bogues eighth patrol.

The battle between U-172 and the ships and aircraft lasted for 27 hours.

1944
Bogue had a break from her anti-submarine operations during January and February, when she ferried a cargo of United States Army fighter aircraft to Glasgow.

She then returned to her anti-submarine role.

On 5 May, Bogue and her escorts departed Hampton Roads, Virginia, for a cruise that netted two more submarines and lasted until 2 July. The Mark 24, code-name "Fido" and designated a "mine" for secrecy reasons. 

Following her return in September, Bogue operated on training missions out of Bermuda and Quonset Point, Rhode Island.

1945
In February she completed a ferry trip to Liverpool with US Army Aircraft.

In April, Bogue put to sea again as an anti-submarine vessel, forming part of Captain George J. Dufek's Second Barrier Force during Operation Teardrop.

With the war in the Atlantic over, Bogue moved to the Pacific, arriving at San Diego on 3 July. She then steamed westward to Guam, arriving on 24 July, then to Adak, Alaska, from 19 August to 6 September, then joined the "Operation Magic Carpet" fleet returning servicemen from the Pacific islands.

Post War and decommissioning
She was placed out of commission in reserve on 30 November 1946, at Tacoma, Washington and redesignated CVHE-9, on the 12 June 1955 and struck from the Navy list on 1 March 1959.

In 1960, she was sold to the Hyman-Michaels Company, of Chicago, Illinois, and towed from Bremerton to Everett, Washington, for scrapping.

Awards
Bogue received a Presidential Unit Citation and three battle stars for her World War II service.

References

Bibliography

External links

 
USS Bogue at World War II Database
USS Bogue at Haze Gray & Underway
Hunter-Killer Groups
 

Bogue-class escort carriers of the United States Navy
Ships built in Tacoma, Washington
1942 ships
World War II escort aircraft carriers of the United States